Lindow Woman and Lindow I are the names given to the partial remains of a female bog body, discovered in a peat bog at Lindow Moss, near Wilmslow in Cheshire, England, on 13 May 1983 by commercial peat-cutters. The remains were largely a skull fragment, which was missing its jaw, but with soft tissue and hair attached. The remains were subsequently dated to the Roman period. The remains became more technically known as Lindow I after the discovery of other remains in the same bog, which were identified as Lindow Man or Lindow II in 1984 and Lindow III in 1987.

Before the skull of Lindow Woman was dated, it was assumed to be the skull of a local woman who had gone missing in 1959, Malika de Fernandez. Her husband, Peter Reyn-Bardt, had been under suspicion of murdering her, but no body had been found. He confessed to the crime as a result of the skull's discovery and was convicted as a result of his confession.

Discovery and murder investigation
The bog body of Lindow I was discovered on 13 May 1983 by commercial peat cutters, Andy Mould and Stephen Dooley. They first noticed an unusual item on the conveyor belt, which was similar in shape and size to a football. They took the object from the conveyor to examine it more closely. After they removed the adhesive remains of peat, they realized they had found an incomplete preserved human head with attached remnants of soft tissue, brain, eye, optic nerve, and hair.

The police were summoned to deal with the remains, and suspected a crime. They launched a murder investigation. For over two decades, a local 57-year-old man Peter Reyn-Bardt, had been under suspicion of murdering his estranged wife, Malika de Fernandez, and of disposing of her body. When questioned, Reyn-Bardt assumed that the skull fragment came from his wife's body, and said, "It has been so long I thought I would never be found out." He admitted to strangling her, dismembering her body, and burying the remains in a drainage ditch.

Because the rest of De Fernandez' remains could not be found, Detective Inspector George Abbott sent the head to Oxford University for further study. Carbon-14 dating of the skull fragment returned a date of 1740 ± 80BP (c. 250 AD), suggesting that it dated back to Roman Britain.

After the origins of the head were revealed, Reyn-Bardt withdrew his confession; despite this and the fact that no trace of Fernandez' body was found, he was brought to trial at Chester Crown Court in December 1983. At trial, he pleaded guilty to manslaughter. He told the jury that his estranged wife had come to the cottage where he lived with another man; that she had threatened to expose his homosexuality (still criminalized under British law at the time); and that his wife died during an argument over money. He said he could not recall how his wife died, but that he had no doubt he caused her death. The jury found him guilty of murder. He spent the rest of his life in prison.

Today, only the bony remains of the skull from the discovery exist, because of the handling of evidence by the police. The remains of the skull were anthropologically identified as probably belonging to a woman 30 to 50 years old. Recent studies have suggested doubt about the sex of the individual.

Another body was recovered in the area in 1987, and is referred to as Lindow III. It was headless and has a vestigial thumb. A theory described the killings of both Lindow I and II as ritual sacrifice attributed to the Celtic enclaves.

Chemistry of bog bodies
The preservation of bog bodies is dependent on a set of specific chemical conditions, which can occur in peat bogs. A sphagnum moss bog must have a temperature lower than 4°C at the time of the deposition of the body. The subsequent average annual temperature must be lower than 10°C. Moisture must be stable in the bog year-round: it cannot dry out.

Sphagnum moss affects the chemistry of nearby water, which becomes highly acidic relative to a more natural environment (a pH of roughly 3.3 to 4.5). The concentration of dissolved minerals also tends to be low. Dying moss forms layers of sediment and releases sugars and humic acids that consume oxygen. Since the surface of the water is covered by living moss, water becomes anaerobic. As a result, human tissues buried in the bog tend to tan rather than decay.

See also

 Haraldskær Woman
 Worsley Man

References

Bibliography

Bog bodies
History of Cheshire
Archaeological sites in Cheshire
Iron Age Britain
1983 archaeological discoveries